Soazza is a municipality in the Moesa Region in the Swiss canton of Graubünden.

History
Soazza is first mentioned in 1203 as Soaza.

Geography

 
Of this area, 7.2% is used for agricultural purposes, while 53.7% is forested. Of the rest of the land, 1.5% is settled (buildings or roads) and the remainder (37.7%) is non-productive (rivers, glaciers or mountains).

Demographics
, 11.9% of the population was made up of foreign nationals. Over the last 10 years the population has decreased at a rate of -6.9%. Most of the population speaks Italian (91.9%), with German being second most common ( 3.3%) and Serbo-Croatian being third ( 2.2%).

, the gender distribution of the population was 54.4% male and 45.6% female.  The age distribution, in Soazza is; 37 children or 10.3% of the population are between 0 and 9 years old.  17 teenagers or 4.7% are 10 to 14, and 10 teenagers or 2.8% are 15 to 19.  Of the adult population, 35 people or 9.7% of the population are between 20 and 29 years old.  64 people or 17.8% are 30 to 39, 49 people or 13.6% are 40 to 49, and 42 people or 11.7% are 50 to 59.  The senior population distribution is 51 people or 14.2% of the population are between 60 and 69 years old, 37 people or 10.3% are 70 to 79, there are 16 people or 4.5% who are 80 to 89, and there is 1 person who is 90 to 99.

In the 2007 federal election the most popular party was the CVP which received 34.9% of the vote.  The next three most popular parties were the SP (28.5%), the SVP (26%) and the FDP (9.2%).

In Soazza about 73.3% of the population (between age 25-64) have completed either non-mandatory upper secondary education or additional higher education (either university or a Fachhochschule).

Soazza has an unemployment rate of 2.6%.  , there were 24 people employed in the primary economic sector and about 9 businesses involved in this sector.  71 people are employed in the secondary sector and there are 7 businesses in this sector.  38 people are employed in the tertiary sector, with 14 businesses in this sector.

The historical population is given in the following table:

Heritage sites of national significance
The Casa Paret, the Church of S. Martino including the della Madonna Addolorata and the Ospizio e Via Crucis are listed as Swiss heritage sites of national significance.

References

External links

 Official website 
 

 
Municipalities of Graubünden
Cultural property of national significance in Graubünden